In mathematics, bialgebroid may refer to 

 Lie bialgebroid, a pair of two compatible Lie algebroids defined on dual vector bundles; here Lie algebroid is a vector bundle with a map into the tangent bundle over its base manifold and an anticommutative bracket operation on the space of sections of the vector bundle satisfying some axioms
 associative bialgebroid, an algebraic structure involving two algebras, the base algebra and a total algebra and a number of additional structure morphisms, generalizing associative bialgebras
 internal bialgebroid, a generalization of an associative bialgebroid where vector spaces are replaced by objects in a more general symmetric monoidal category